Although Togo's foreign policy is nonaligned, it has strong historical and cultural ties with western Europe, especially France and Germany. Togo recognizes the People's Republic of China, North Korea, and Cuba. It re-established relations with Israel in 1987.

Togo pursues an active foreign policy and participates in many international organizations. It is particularly active in West African regional affairs and in the African Union. Relations between Togo and neighboring states are generally good.

Bilateral relations

See also
 List of diplomatic missions in Togo
 List of diplomatic missions of Togo

References